The Bishop and Apostolic Administrator of Kilmacduagh and Kilfenora was an episcopal title which took its name after the small villages of Kilmacduagh in County Galway and Kilfenora in County Clare, Ireland.  Accurately, the title was an alternative sequence of the Bishop of Kilmacduagh and Administrator Apostolic of Kilfenora followed by the next holder as the Bishop of Kilfenora and Administrator Apostolic of Kilmacduagh.

History
It was decreed by Pope Benedict XIV in 1750 that the Episcopal sees of Kilmacduagh and Kilfenora were to be united. The bishop of the united dioceses was to be alternately bishop of one diocese and apostolic administrator of the other, since the two dioceses were in different ecclesiastical provinces. The first bishop under this new arrangement was Peter Kilkelly, who had been Bishop of Kilmacduagh since 1744, became Apostolic Administrator of Kilfenora in September 1750.

Following the resignation of Bishop Patrick Fallon in 1866, John MacEvilly, Bishop of Galway (later Archbishop of Tuam), was appointed Apostolic Administrator of both the dioceses of Kilmacduagh and Kilfenora. In 1883, the see of Kilmacduagh was united with Galway, and the bishops of the united see were also made permanently apostolic administrators of Kilfenora.

List of bishops and apostolic administrators

References

Kilmacduagh and Kilfenora
Religion in County Clare
Religion in County Galway
Kilmacduagh and Kilfenora